Edmond Clarke (born 29 December 1998) is an English professional footballer who plays as a left back for Bootle.

Career
Clarke began his career with Tranmere Rovers. In the 2018 National League play-off Final at Wembley, Clarke was substituted on for Larnell Cole after only nine minutes; Clarke played the rest of the game as ten-man Tranmere won 2-1 to return to the English Football League. 

Clarke signed for Fleetwood Town in May 2018. On 22 July 2019, Clarke joined League Two side Macclesfield Town on a season-long loan deal. On 16 January 2020, Clarke was recalled by Fleetwood and joined National League side Stockport County on loan until the end of the season.

In October 2020, Fleetwood cancelled Clarke's contract by mutual consent and he subsequently signed a contract for Northern Premier League Premier Division side Warrington Town in November. In January 2021 he signed for Cymru Premier side Flint Town United on a short-term deal following the suspension of the Northern Premier League due to COVID-19. He returned to sign for Warrington Town for the 2021–22 season. Having departed at the end of the 2021–22 season, Clarke remained with the club for injury rehabilitation and following his return to full fitness, re-signed in October 2022. Clarke departed the club by mutual consent in January 2023. On 4 February 2023, he signed for Bootle.

Career statistics

References

1998 births
Living people
English footballers
Tranmere Rovers F.C. players
Fleetwood Town F.C. players
Association football fullbacks
Macclesfield Town F.C. players
Stockport County F.C. players
Warrington Town F.C. players
Flint Town United F.C. players
Bootle F.C. players
English Football League players
National League (English football) players
Northern Premier League players
Cymru Premier players